Malsha Shehani (born 5 June 1995) is a Sri Lankan cricketer. She made her Women's One Day International cricket (WODI) debut against India in the 2017 Women's Cricket World Cup Qualifier on 7 February 2017. On 7 June 2018, she made her Women's Twenty20 International cricket (WT20I) debut, also against India, in the 2018 Women's Twenty20 Asia Cup.

In November 2019, she was named in Sri Lanka's squad for the women's cricket tournament at the 2019 South Asian Games. The Sri Lankan team won the silver medal, after losing to Bangladesh by two runs in the final. In July 2022, she was named in Sri Lanka's team for the cricket tournament at the 2022 Commonwealth Games in Birmingham, England.

References

External links
 

1995 births
Living people
Sri Lankan women cricketers
Sri Lanka women One Day International cricketers
Sri Lanka women Twenty20 International cricketers
Place of birth missing (living people)
South Asian Games silver medalists for Sri Lanka
South Asian Games medalists in cricket
Cricketers at the 2022 Commonwealth Games
Commonwealth Games competitors for Sri Lanka